Miłocice may refer to the following places in Poland:
Miłocice, Oława County in Lower Silesian Voivodeship (south-west Poland)
Miłocice, Strzelin County in Lower Silesian Voivodeship (south-west Poland)
Miłocice, Lesser Poland Voivodeship (south Poland)
Miłocice, Pomeranian Voivodeship (north Poland)